Shahindokht Molaverdi (born 23 October 1965) is an Iranian academic, feminist, jurist, scholar and aide to the President of Iran.  She served as vice president for women and family affairs in Iranian President Hassan Rouhani's first cabinet (2013–17). In Rouhani's second cabinet (2017–present) she became his special assistant for citizenship rights.

In 2020 Molaverdi was accused and sentenced for leaking information. She appealed and was acquitted of all charges in 2022.

 Acquitted of all Charges
In 2023, according to a concurrent resolution passed overwhelmingly with 420 "yea" votes in the 118th Congress, "Shahindokht Molaverdi...was charged with encouraging “corruption, prostitution, and sexual deviance”, a common charge against women refusing mandatory hijab laws, and sentenced in December 2020 to 30 months in prison for defending the right of women to attend sporting events and criticizing the practice of child marriage.". She was never imprisoned. After appealing, she was acquitted of all charges in 2022.

References

People from Khoy
1965 births
Living people

Hijab
Iranian women lawyers
Female vice presidents of Iran
Vice presidents of Iran for Women and Family Affairs
Shahid Beheshti University alumni
Iranian women's rights activists
Iranian feminists
Islamic Iran Participation Front politicians
Presidential aides of Iran
Secretaries-General of political parties in Iran
Women vice presidents
Iranian politicians convicted of crimes
21st-century Iranian women politicians
21st-century Iranian politicians
20th-century Iranian lawyers
21st-century Iranian lawyers